Publius Decius Mus was a Roman politician and general of the plebeian gens Decia. He was the son of Publius Decius Mus, who was consul in 312 BC. As consul in 279 BC, he and his fellow consul, Publius Sulpicius Saverrio, combined their armies against Pyrrhus of Epirus at the Battle of Asculum.

Pyrrhus was victorious, but at such a high cost that the security of Asculum was guaranteed. This is the origin of the term "Pyrrhic victory". According to one tradition, Decius died in the field; according to another, he survived.

Both his father and grandfather had fallen in battle after performing the ritual of devotio before the troops, before rushing the enemy. According to one report, Mus was planning to do the same at Asculum.

References

3rd-century BC Roman consuls
Ancient Roman generals
Mus, Publius
Pyrrhic War